The Asian Sudoku Championship (ASC) is an annual international sudoku competition organised by a member of the World Puzzle Federation (WPF). The first official event was held in Jeju Island, South Korea in 2018 and the latest event was held in Hyderabad, India in 2020. National teams are determined by local affiliates of the WPF. The competition typically consists of several classic sudokus and variations to be solved by all competitors over multiple timed rounds.

In the individual championship, Seungjae Kwak of South Korea, Kota Morinishi of Japan and Sun Cheran of China, each has won one title.

In the team championship, India has won twice and Japan has won once.

Results

Records 
Most of the champions have won with a considerable lead but the lower ranks have been closely contested.

See also 
 World Sudoku Championship
 World Puzzle Federation

External links 
 Official Website of ASC 2020
 Official Website of ASC 2019
 Official Website of ASC 2018
 Results of ASC 2020
 Results of ASC 2019
 Results of ASC 2018

References 

Puzzle competitions
Sudoku competitions